The Harkleroad wind turbine is a wind turbine in Novato, California. It was built to generate electricity.  It appears in Northern California along U.S. Route 101, a heavily traveled freeway.

Around 1960, Sam Harkleroad designed and constructed three unusual structures on a plot of land in Novato, Marin County, California:
 A round home that rotates
 A home built in 1959, with a roof shaped as a hyperbolic paraboloid
 A workshop building, with the Harkleroad wind turbine on the roof

Sam Harkleroad
Sam Harkleroad was born on October 20, 1909, and grew up on a farm in Fresno.  His education ended with high school.  He lived much of his life in  Marin County.  Harkleroad died on June 12, 1993, at the age of 83. Sam and his wife were very nice people, they had a Daughter, Renee Israel. 

Harkleroad was a contractor, who liked to use recycled materials.

The Harkleroad structures are on a street named Harkle Road.

Round house
The round house once appeared in a Popular Mechanics article, which explained how the house was able to rotate 320 degrees, while the plumbing and electrical systems continued to function.

The house rides on "inverted" railroad track and is powered by a used washing machine motor. The rooms are pie shaped. There is a spiral staircase in the middle leading to the basement and motor room. Those dark squares you see around the outside of the house are actually gates. There is one stationary stairway leading up to the deck. So, regardless of which way the house has rotated, there is a gate to let you onto the deck. 

Sam actually built more than 3 houses, there were several very unusual dwellings. Most were destroyed when the 101 freeway was built across Sam's land. Sam Harkleroad was known as "The Frank Lloyd Wright of Marin County."

Taco house
One of the three buildings has a saddle roof made of 2-by-4 lumber.

This house was for sale in 1959, with a minimum bid of $32,000.
The "Taco House" has movable interior walls so the occupant can change the shape and size of rooms.

Workshop
The roof of the workshop has a Savonius wind turbine.  The turbine once provided electricity for the workshop, however, it is no longer used for electricity.  Instead, it provides a novel sight for travelers along U.S. Route 101 in Marin County, California.

References

External links
 Wind turbine on Flicker
 Round house onFlicker

Novato, California
Wind turbines